Kazakhstan has participated in every edition of the Turkvision Song Contest since the inaugural contest in .

History
Kazakhstan was one of 24 countries and regions to make its début in the inaugural  contest in Eskişehir, Turkey. The first Kazakhstani entry in the contest was "Birlikpen alǵa" performed by Rin'go, which placed 9th in the final with 178 points.

Kazakhstan has never hosted the contest, although Nur-Sultan, then known as Astana, had been confirmed as the host city of the 2017 contest before its cancellation. The contest was to be held in the Saryarka Velodrome. Kazakhstan is set to host the 2021 contest in Turkistan.

Participation overview

Hostings

Related involvement

Jury members

Commentators

See also 
 Kazakhstan in the ABU TV Song Festival
 Kazakhstan in the Junior Eurovision Song Contest

Notes and references

Notes

References

 
Turkvision
Countries in the Turkvision Song Contest